Cabanas is a municipality in  the province of A Coruña in the autonomous community of Galicia in northwestern Spain. It is 37 kilometers from A Coruña.

Cabanas was founded by the Counts of Traba in the eleventh century.

Economy 
The major sectors are tourism (from 1950s and in particular from the early 1970s), farming, agriculture and services, though tourism is predominantly seasonal concentrating itself predominantly in the summer months.

References

Municipalities in the Province of A Coruña